The 1944 Tennessee gubernatorial election was held on November 7, 1944. Democratic nominee Jim Nance McCord defeated Republican nominee John W. Kilgo with 62.50% of the vote.

Primary elections
Primary elections were held on August 3, 1944.

Democratic primary

Candidates
Jim Nance McCord, U.S. Representative
John Randolph Neal Jr., attorney
W. Rex Manning

Results

Republican primary

Candidates
John W. Kilgo
W. O. Lowe
H. C. Lowery
L. L. Guinn
Roy Acuff
Sam J. McAllister

Results

General election

Candidates
Major party candidates
Jim Nance McCord, Democratic
John W. Kilgo, Republican 

Other candidates
John Randolph Neal Jr., Independent

Results

References

1944
Tennessee
Gubernatorial